Warnors Theatre is a historic theater located in downtown Fresno, California.  The 2,100-seat venue opened in 1928 as the Pantages Theater, after the name of its then owner, Alexander Pantages, and later, the Warner Theater  in 1929 after it was purchased by Warner Brothers. The name was changed again in the 1960s to "Warnors" to avoid trademark issues.

The theater was designed by B. Marcus Priteca, and is listed on the National Register of Historic Places.

Organ

The theater features a unit orchestra (a pipe organ which includes numerous features and instruments, meant to be able to replicate sounds of a full orchestra with only one organist), which was manufactured by the Robert Morton Organ Company of Van Nuys, California and installed in 1928. The organ was to be used to accompany silent films. Around the same time the organ was to be installed, movies were beginning to include sound. The theater tried to cancel the order but the organ was installed anyway.  The organ has 14 ranks built with 1,035 pipes and a four-manual console with 720 keys, pedals and combination pistons.  The organ was used primarily for motion pictures until 1973.  Because of the cost of paying orchestra members, most accompanying orchestras were replaced with unit orchestras.

The Berlin Philharmonic gave a concert in the theater on November 15, 1956, under its new music director Herbert von Karajan.

References

External links
Warnors Theatre website

Cinemas and movie theaters in California
Buildings and structures in Fresno, California
National Register of Historic Places in Fresno County, California
Theatres on the National Register of Historic Places in California
Theatres in California
Theatres completed in 1928
1928 establishments in California
B. Marcus Priteca buildings
Tourist attractions in Fresno, California
Music venues in Fresno, California
Public venues with a theatre organ